Jacquire King (born January 11, 1967) is an American record producer, recording engineer and mixer. King has worked with such notable artists as Kings of Leon, Tom Waits, James Bay, Kaleo, Modest Mouse, Shania Twain, Buddy Guy, Norah Jones, Of Monsters and Men, Cold War Kids, Punch Brothers, City and Colour, Robert Ellis, Dawes and others. His work has received more than 35 Grammy Award nominations to date.

Career
King had his initial training in recording engineering at Recording Workshop in Chillicothe, Ohio. His first studio employment was in the Washington, D.C. area. In 1988, he moved to California and got a job at Different Fur Studios in San Francisco. King later interned for Dan Alexander at Coast Recorders, which led to him helping two friends open Toast Studios, where he began working as an assistant. After hearing that Tom Waits was looking for a new engineer, King auditioned and was chosen to engineer Waits' critically-acclaimed 1999 album Mule Variations at Prairie Sun Recording Studios.

King utilizes traditional analog techniques and equipment such as tracking to 2" analog tape, combined with modern technologies like computer-based recording via Pro Tools and software plug-ins that emulate classic outboard Universal Audio and Neve signal processing gear.

In 2007 Jacquire disassembled and modified his 40-channel Quad-Eight Coronado console, converting it into two identical 16-channel/32-input consoles, and in 2013, he established residency at Blackbird Studio G in Nashville, Tennessee, which served as his primary studio for the next 6 years.

In 2014 he hosted his first Mix With The Masters seminar at Studios La Fabrique in Saint-Rémy-de-Provence, France. In 2019, he established his own studio, LBT, in Nashville.

Awards
2010 - Grammy Award - Record of the Year for Kings Of Leon's 'Use Somebody' awarded to Kings Of Leon (Caleb Followill, Jared Followill, Matthew Followill, Nathan Followill), artist. Jacquire King, engineer/mixer. Jacquire King & Angelo Petraglia, producers.
2003 - Grammy Award - Best Traditional Blues Album for Buddy Guy's 'Blues Singer'
1999 - Grammy Award - Best Contemporary Folk Album for Tom Waits's 'Mule Variations'

Discography

Selected listing:

References

External links
 Official website

1967 births
Living people
Record producers from Washington, D.C.
Songwriters from Washington, D.C.
American male songwriters
American audio engineers
Grammy Award winners